The Men's 10K Marathon swim at the 2007 Pan American Games occurred in the waters off Copacabana Beach in Rio de Janeiro, Brazil on 14 July 2007.

Medalists

Results

References
 Official Site

Open Water, Men's
Pan American Games